Francisco Rebollo López (born August 5, 1938 in San Juan, Puerto Rico), is a Puerto Rican jurist, who served as an Associate Justice on the Supreme Court of Puerto Rico from 1982 until his mandatory retirement in 2008.

Career
Rebollo received his law degree from the University of Puerto Rico in 1963. He went to serve in various courts of Puerto Rico until Governor Carlos Romero Barceló appointed him to the Supreme Court. He took the oath of office in July 1982 after ratification by the Senate of Puerto Rico. In the court, Justice Rebollo has taken a moderate path in his judicial opinions, often being the swing vote in court decisions.

Rebollo has held the position of Interim Chief Justice of the Supreme Court of Puerto Rico during periods when the seat of Chief Justice has been vacant. Continued to serve as Associate Justice until his retirement in 2008.

Rebollo is affiliated with the New Progressive Party of Puerto Rico.

References

1938 births
Living people
Associate Justices of the Supreme Court of Puerto Rico
Chief Justices of the Supreme Court of Puerto Rico
People from San Juan, Puerto Rico
University of Puerto Rico alumni